Daniel Alexis Parra Durán (born 20 July 1999) is a Mexican professional footballer who plays as a left-back for Liga de Expansión MX club Atlético Morelia, on loan from Monterrey.

Career statistics

Club

Honours
Monterrey
CONCACAF Champions League: 2021

References

External links
 

Living people
1999 births
Mexican footballers
Association football defenders
C.F. Monterrey players
Liga MX players
Liga Premier de México players
Tercera División de México players
Footballers from Guanajuato
People from Celaya
Raya2 Expansión players